is the third studio album released by Mucc on September 3, 2003. Released by Universal Gear, it is their major label debut. The album reached number 17 on the Oricon chart.

Recording and release
In 2022, Miya recalled that recording Zekū was painful as they were in the studio until 5 a.m. every day. He also insisted on recording with tape, but had to splice it in so many different places because he made mistakes in his performance, that the powder came out. They originally had a ¥10 million budget, but costs went up to ¥15 million because recording took so long.

The first press limited edition release included a DVD, different artwork, and a bonus one track CD. The European version, released on May 19, 2006, features two bonus tracks which were b-sides from the single "Waga, Arubeki Basho".

Track listing

Note
 Re-recording of "Bōzenjishitsu", "1979", and "Ranchū" were featured on their 2017 self-cover album Koroshi no Shirabe II This is NOT Greatest Hits.

Covers 
"Bōzenjishitsu" and "Ranchū" were covered by Lynch. and ROTTENGRAFFTY respectively, on the 2017 Mucc tribute album Tribute Of Mucc -en-.

References 

Mucc albums
2003 albums